Christopher Benjamin Rungkat (born 14 January 1990) is an Indonesian tennis player. In 2008, he won the final stage of French Open 2008 Boys' Doubles Juniors category with Finnish tennis player Henri Kontinen. He is the youngest ever Indonesian to be the All Indonesian Champion, and by the end of his junior career, he was awarded for Indonesian best promising athlete 2008.

Rungkat also reached the final of the 2008 US Open boys' final with Henri Kontinen. Rungkat is the first Indonesian to reach US open boys' finalist and to win the doubles title of French Open.

In June 2010, he won the Tarakan Open International Men's Futures tournament, his first international tournament title since going pro. He won his maiden ATP title in Men's Doubles partnered with Swedish player André Göransson in February 2020, 13 years since going pro.

Personal life
He is the grandson of Benny Rungkat, former chairman of the Indonesian Air Carriers Association. Christopher's father, Michael Alexander Fritz Rungkat, is of Dutch and Indonesian descent and his mother, Elfia Mirlianti, is full Indonesian descent.

Christopher Rungkat partnered up with PocariID in 2007 for a project called Pocari Sweat Sport Science hoping to help Christopher maximize his performance.

Career
Christopher Rungkat spent his junior career in Europe by playing on the European Junior Circuit and was based in Tennis Val (Valencia, Spain). He is the second Asian male player to win a junior French Open doubles title, after Kei Nishikori. He was the winner of the Men's Singles title at the 2017 Southeast Asian Games in Kuala Lumpur.

A year later at the 2018 Asian Games in his home country, Rungkat was partnered up with Aldila Sutjiadi for the Mixed Doubles category in just two weeks, and was not targeted to grab any medals. However, they surprised with getting the gold medal after producing a couple of upsets and eventually beating Thai pair Sonchat Ratiwatana and Luksika Kumkhum in the end to get the gold medal.

He started 2019 with a title in Da Nang Vietnam Airlines Tennis Open   with partner Cheng-Peng Hsieh beating former world number 1 in the doubles semi-final Leander Paes and partner Divij Sharan. In February, Rungkat reached his first doubles final ATP Tour 250 at The Sofia Open with partner Cheng-Peng Hsieh.

After 13 years on the ATP Tour, Rungkat won his maiden ATP title at the 250 event 2020 Maharashtra Open in Pune, India in the Men's Doubles section. Partnered with André Göransson, Rungkat defeated fourth seed and his former partner Cheng-Peng Hsieh who competed with Denys Molchanov 3–6, 6–4, [10–8] in the first round to advance to the quarterfinal. They then surprised the French team of Benoît Paire and Antoine Hoang in straight sets 6–3, 6–3 before securing a spot in the final with a win over Romain Arneodo and Andre Begemann 6–4, 7–6(7–1). In the final, the pairing defeated third seed Jonathan Erlich and Andrei Vasilevski 6–2, 3–6, [10–8].

Awards and nominations

Grand Slam performance timeline

Singles

Doubles

Mixed doubles

ATP career finals

Doubles: 2 (1 title, 1 runner-up)

Challenger and Futures finals

Singles: 17 (11 titles, 6 runner-ups)

Doubles: 80 (48 titles, 32 runner-ups)

Note: Tournaments sourced from official ITF archives

Junior Grand Slam finals

Doubles: 2 (1 title, 1 runner-up)

ITF Junior finals

Singles: 5 (4 titles, 1 runner-up)

Doubles: 22 (13 titles, 9 runner-ups)  

Note: Tournaments sourced from official ITF archives

National representation

Multi-sports event
Rungkat made his debut representing Indonesia in multi-sports event at the 2007 Southeast Asian Games, he won the men's doubles bronze medal.

Singles: 3 (3 gold)

Doubles: 4 (2 gold, 2 bronze)

Mixed doubles: 5 (3 gold, 2 silver)

References

External links
 
 

1990 births
Indonesian male tennis players
Indonesian Christians
Living people
Tennis players at the 2014 Asian Games
Tennis players at the 2018 Asian Games
Asian Games medalists in tennis
Asian Games gold medalists for Indonesia
Medalists at the 2018 Asian Games
Indo people
Indonesian people of Dutch descent
Minahasa people
Southeast Asian Games gold medalists for Indonesia
Southeast Asian Games silver medalists for Indonesia
Southeast Asian Games bronze medalists for Indonesia
Southeast Asian Games medalists in tennis
French Open junior champions
Competitors at the 2007 Southeast Asian Games
Competitors at the 2009 Southeast Asian Games
Competitors at the 2011 Southeast Asian Games
Competitors at the 2015 Southeast Asian Games
Competitors at the 2017 Southeast Asian Games
Grand Slam (tennis) champions in boys' doubles
Competitors at the 2019 Southeast Asian Games
Islamic Solidarity Games competitors for Indonesia
Sportspeople from Jakarta
Competitors at the 2021 Southeast Asian Games
21st-century Indonesian people